The governor-general of Jamaica is the viceregal representative of the Jamaican monarch, King Charles III, in Jamaica.

The monarch, on the advice of the prime minister, appoints a governor-general as his or her representative in Jamaica. Both the monarch and the governor-general hold much power, but rarely exercise it, usually only in emergencies and, in some cases, war.

The governor-general represents the monarch on ceremonial occasions such as the Ceremonial Opening of Parliament, the presentation of honours, and military parades. Under the Constitution, they are given authority to act in some matters, for example in appointing and disciplining officers of the civil service, proroguing Parliament, and so on, but only in a few cases do they have the power to act entirely at their own discretion.

Jamaican republicanism, a position which is held by the current Jamaican government, generally advocates for the replacement of the governor-general with a non-executive president.

List of governors-general of Jamaica
Following is a list of people who have served as Governor-General of Jamaica since independence in 1962.

See also

 List of governors of Jamaica
 Monarchy of Jamaica
 Politics of Jamaica
 Prime Minister of Jamaica

References

External links
 Governor-General of Jamaica - Official website

Jamaica, List of Governors-General of
 
Governors-General
1962 establishments in Jamaica